SWACHA, the Southwestern Automated Clearing House Association, is a regional trade association with the mission of providing education, training, representation and knowledge regarding electronic payments and payments system risks to its approximately 1,100 members across the Southwest, United States.  SWACHA members are provided electronic payments training and industry resource materials, risk management programs and representation at a national level in the development of ACH policies and rules.

History
SWACHA was formed in the early 1970s by leading financial institutions in the states of Texas, New Mexico and Louisiana as a trade association for the electronic payments industry.  Today, the association's 1,100 members include financial institutions, businesses, government agencies and professionals.

SWACHA operates under the direction of a member-elected board of directors and is assisted by a number of advisory committees populated by senior and executive officers of member organizations.

Member Locations
SWACHA's members include financial institutions, businesses, government agencies and professionals throughout Texas, Louisiana and New Mexico.

References

External links
SWACHA Homepage
NACHA Homepage
Accredited ACH Professional Certification Program(AAP)
What is ACH?
List of Regional Payments Associations

Organizations established in 1974
Trade associations based in the United States